Macara purens is a moth of the Megalopygidae family. It was described by Schaus in 1905. It is found in French Guiana.

The body is white and the face, tarsi, fore tibiae and coxae are black. The wings are silvery white, the forewings with the costa finely black, which does not reach the apex.

References

Moths described in 1905
Megalopygidae